Kokry is a village and rural commune in the Cercle of Macina in the Ségou Region of southern-central Mali. The commune covers an area of approximately 160 square kilometers and includes 17 villages. The farmland is irrigated by the Office du Niger irrigation scheme. The main crop is rice. In the 2009 census the commune had a population of 13,393. The main village, (chef-lieu), is called Kokry Centre to distinguish it from Kokry Bozo which lies 3 km to the east on a strip of land between the Niger River and the Distributeur Kokry, an irrigation canal.

References

External links
.

Communes of Ségou Region
Communities on the Niger River